The Invasion of Banu Lahyan took place in September, 627 AD in Rabi' al-awwal or Jumada Al-Awwal, 6 AH of the Islamic calendar .

Background
Muhammad wanted to get justice for the killing of 10 Muslims in Expedition of Al Raji. The Banu Lahyan were situated deep in the heart of Hijaz on the borders of Mecca, and due to deep-seated blood-revenge between the Muslims on the one hand, and Quraish and the Arabians on the other.

When the power of the allied Confederates collapsed and they began to slacken and resign to the current unfavourable balance of power, Muhammad seized this rare opportunity and decided that it was time to take justice on Banu Lahyan.

Invasion
Muhammad set out in Rabi‘ Al-Awwal or Jumada Al-Ula in the year six Hijri (July 627 AD) with 200 Muslim fighters and made a feint of heading for Syria, then soon changed route towards Batn Gharran, the scene of where 10 Muslims were killed in the Expedition of Al Raji. Bani Lahyan were on Alert and got the news of his march, the tribe then immediately fled to the mountain tops nearby and thus remained out of his reach. On his way back, Muhammad despatched a group of ten horsemen to a place called Kura‘ Al-Ghamim, in the vicinity of the habitation of Quraish in order to indirectly confirm his growing military power. All these skirmishes took 14 days, after which he left back for home.

Islamic sources

Hadith literature
The event is mentioned in the Sahih Muslim hadith collection:

See also
List of battles of Muhammad
Military career of Muhammad
Muslim–Quraysh War
Banu Quraysh

Notes

627
Campaigns led by Muhammad
Banu Lahyan